The Coast Transit Authority is the primary provider of mass transportation in the Gulfport–Biloxi metropolitan area. Service was founded in 1974, after the Mississippi State Legislature passed a bill authorizing the creation of public transit for the region; the area's previous private bus operator, Municipal Transit Lines, had been devastated by Hurricane Camille, and the area was left with no public transportation for a 3-year period after the disaster. Originally known as the Mississippi Coast Transit Authority, the agency changed its name to Coast Area Transit in 1985, before arriving on its current moniker in 1992.

The agency operates nine regular routes over a three county area. Five park & ride lots are operated by the bureau to increase commuter ridership. The most travelled of these routes, The Beachcomber, uses replica trolleys instead of standard buses. In addition, the Casino Hopper shuttle connects gambling facilities on the Biloxi waterfront.

Routes
4 D’Iberville
7 Ocean Springs
32 Popps Ferry
34 Gulfport-Biloxi Pass Rd
37 Orange Grove
38 Gulfport West
Beachcomber 
Casino Hopper

Fixed Route Ridership

The ridership and service statistics shown here are of fixed route services only and do not include demand response.

References

 CTA

Bus transportation in Mississippi